Ladies' Night is the eleventh studio album by the funk band Kool & the Gang, released in 1979. The album became their first major success especially after the release of the title track, the U.S. #8 "Ladies' Night," and the U.S. #5 follow-up "Too Hot" which both became Top 10 hits on the Billboard Hot 100. The album brought a return to the mainstream after a lull in success from 1976-1978. Ladies' Night reached number one on the U.S. R&B chart. Additionally, all the cuts from the album reached number five on the disco chart.

With Ladies' Night, Kool & the Gang made their funk style more mainstream by incorporating some pop and light R&B into the sound. The result was that this album was not only popular during the 1970s black-oriented funk era where the band started, but also during the more popular and diverse disco era. Ladies' Night became their first Platinum album. It also marked the debut of lead vocalist James "J.T." Taylor.

Track listing

Personnel

Musical

James "J.T." Taylor - lead and backing vocals
Ronald Bell - tenor saxophone, backing vocals, keyboards, bass
Dennis "D.T." Thomas - alto saxophone, backing vocals
 Claydes Smith - guitars
Eumir Deodato - keyboards
Adam Ippolito - keyboards
Robert "Kool" Bell - bass, backing vocals
George "Funky" Brown - drums, backing vocals

Clifford Adams - trombone
Christine Albert - trumpet
Robert "Spike" Mickens - trumpet
Jon Faddis - trumpet
Cedric Toon - backing vocals
Earl Toon - backing vocals
Something Sweet (Diane Cameron, Cynthia Huggins, Joan Motley) - backing vocals

Technical
Mike Doud - Art Direction
Joe Kotleba - Cover Design
Raul Vega - Photography
Joe Gastwirt - CD Mastering and CD Digital Remastering

Charts

Weekly charts

Year-end charts

Singles

Certifications

See also
List of number-one R&B albums of 1979 (U.S.)

References

External links
 Official Kool & the Gang site

Kool & the Gang albums
1979 albums
De-Lite Records albums
Albums produced by Eumir Deodato